The Golden Abyss (German:Der goldene Abgrund) is a 1927 German silent film directed by Mario Bonnard and starring Liane Haid, André Roanne and Hans Albers.

The film's art direction was by Andrej Andrejew and Alexander Ferenczy.

Cast
 Liane Haid as Jola und Claire  
 André Roanne as Jean Hudin  
 Claude Mérelle as Dolores Coreto  
 Hugo Werner-Kahle as Dr. Codrus 
 Hans Albers as Baron Armand  
 Robert Leffler as Pater Ambrosius, der Missionar  
 Raimondo Van Riel as Ein Sträflingsanführer  
 Ekkehard Arendt as Claires Freund  
 Oreste Bilancia

References

Bibliography
 Hans-Michael Bock and Tim Bergfelder. The Concise Cinegraph: An Encyclopedia of German Cinema. Berghahn Books.

External links

1927 films
Films of the Weimar Republic
Films directed by Mario Bonnard
German silent feature films
Films with screenplays by Franz Schulz
German black-and-white films